Prince Seeiso Bereng Seeiso of Lesotho, Principal Chief of Matsieng (born 16 April 1966) is the younger brother of Lesotho's King Letsie III, and son of the Southern African country's late King Moshoeshoe II (1938–1996) and the late Queen 'Mamohato Bereng Seeiso (1941–2003).

Biography 
He served as the President of the Senate of Lesotho from 2015 to 2017 and as the Lesotho High Commissioner to the United Kingdom. Prince Seeiso received the Diplomat of the Year from Africa Award from the Diplomat Magazine. He is also a Chevening Scholar, and obtained a master's degree in International Studies from the University of Birmingham in 1996.

In April 2006, he and Prince Harry formed a charity called Sentebale which means "forget-me-not" to support organizations working with Lesotho's disadvantaged young people and children, particularly those orphaned as a result of HIV and AIDS.

He was awarded an honorary degree by University of Birmingham in 2007.

He is the Principal Chief of Matsieng.

He and his wife attended the wedding of Prince Harry and Meghan Markle, the only foreign royals to do so.

Marriage and family 

Prince Seeiso is married to Princess Mabereng Seeiso of Lesotho (born 'Machaka Makara) on 15 December 2003. They have three children, two sons and one daughter:

 Prince Bereng Constantine Seeiso.
 Princess 'Masentle Tabitha Seeiso.
 Prince Masupha David Seeiso.

Patronages 
 Sentebale.

Honours

Foreign honours
  :
  Two Sicilian Royal Family: Knight Grand Cross of Justice of the Two Sicilian Royal Sacred Military Constantinian Order of Saint George (8 October 2013).

Ancestry

References

Monarchy of Lesotho
Lesotho royalty
Lesotho Christians
House of Moshesh
Presidents of the Senate (Lesotho)
Living people
1966 births
Alumni of the University of Birmingham
High Commissioners of Lesotho to the United Kingdom
People from Maseru District
Chevening Scholars
Sons of kings